The Official Gazette of Iraq has been the official source for the laws and resolutions passed by the Council of Representatives of Iraq since August 1922. Article 125 of the Constitution mandates that laws shall be published in the gazette and shall take effect on the date of their publication, unless stipulated otherwise. It is published by the Ministry of Justice.

In September 2008, the Iraqi Legal Database was launched by the United Nations Development Programme (UNDP) through its Programme on Governance in the Arab Region (POGAR).

See also 
Iraqi Legal Database

External links
Global Justice Project: Iraq

Government of Iraq
Law of Iraq
Newspapers published in Iraq
Arabic-language newspapers
Iraq, Official Gazette of
1922 establishments in Iraq
Publications established in 1922